Mélodie Française is a compilation album of iconic French pop songs covered by Australian musicians. It was officially released in Australia by Inertia (independent record company) and Original Matters on 16 August 2013.

Upon its release, Mélodie Française received positive reviews and support from leading Australian music media outlets: Rolling Stone Australia, The Music Network, Music Feeds, Tone Deaf, the AU Review and Russh.

An album review by Greg Moskovitch of Music Feeds states: "Mélodie Française will course through you like a gliding plume of Gauloises smoke, so bring out your inner Francophile and order this sublime compilation of Aussie artists paying tribute to the language of love through iTunes now."

In a special feature, Australian Harper’s Bazaar said, “Francophiles rejoice. Last week, Mélodie Française - the highly anticipated Australian compilation of French covers - landed in our laps and it’s safe to say we’re hooked".

On 2 October 2013, Mélodie Française was nominated for Best World Music Album under the ARIA Music Awards Fine Arts category.

Singles
The album's official lead single was "La Minute de Silence". Reinterpreted by Gossling and Oh Mercy (band)'s Alexander Gow, the single received support on triple j; premiered by music director Richard Kingsmill in March 2013.

"Bonnie & Clyde", a collaboration between Deep Sea Arcade and Megan Washington was the second single released from the album, and the last song to be recorded for the compilation.

Videos
For the music video of "La Minute de Silence", Gossling and Alexander Gow travelled to Paris. They were granted unprecedented access to film at the Moulin Rouge. Of the music clip, Pages Digital said, "It’s tender, romantic and very beautifully shot.”

Awards

Track listing

References

Compilation albums by Australian artists